A list of films and television series shot in or near the city of Sonora, a historic Gold Rush mining town in the Sierra Nevada foothills and Tuolumne County, California.

List

 The A-Team (1983) TV Series
 A Woman Called Moses (1978)
 The Adventures of Brisco County, Jr. (1993)
 Against All Odds (1924)
 Alex & the Gypsy (1976)
 The American Short Story (1976)
 Another 48 Hrs. (1990)
 Apache (1954)
 The Apple Dumpling Gang Rides Again (1979)
 Back to the Future Part III (1990)
 Baby Doll (1956)
 Bad Girls (1994/I)
 Bad Men of Missouri (1941) 
 Behind the Mask of Zorro (2005)
 Belle Star (1980)
 The Best Bad Man (1925)
 The Big Country (1958)
 The Big Land (1957)
 The Big Valley (1965) TV Series
 Blood Red (1988)
 Bonanza (1959) TV Series
 Bonanza: The Return (1993)
 Booker (1984)
 The Border Legion (1918) 
 The Border Legion (1930)
 Bound for Glory (1976)
 The Branding Iron (1920)
 The Brothers (2006)
 Bullwhip (1958)
 California Conquest (1951)
 The Call of the Wild (1935)
 Casey Jones (1957) TV Series
 Cat Story (1988)
 Catch My Smoke (1922)
 The Charge of the Light Brigade (1936)
 Chattanooga Choo Choo (1983) 
 The Cimarron Kid (1951)
 Cimarron Strip (1967) TV Series 
 Come Live with Me (1941)
 Conflict (1936)
 The Conquering Horde (1931)
 The Conquerors (1932) 
 The County Chairman (1935)
 The Covered Wagon (1923)
 Death Valley Days (1953) TV Series
 The Deputies (Law of the Land) (1976) TV Series
 Dirty Mary, Crazy Larry (1974)
 Dodge City (1939) 
 Down Rio Grande Way (1942) 
 Downwardly Mobile (1996) 
 Drums of the Deep South (1951) 
 Duel in the Sun (1946) 
 Dundee and the Culhane (1967) TV Series 
 East of Eden (1981) 
 The Eagle's Talons (1923)
 The F.B.I. (1965) TV Series
 Face of a Fugitive (1959)
 The Farmer Takes a Wife (1935)
 Fast Charlie the Moonbeam Rider (1979)
 Father Murphy (1982) TV Series
 Fighting Caravans (1931) 
 Finian's Rainbow (1968)
 Flying Lariats (1931)
 For Whom the Bell Tolls (1943)
 The Galloping Ace (1924)
 Girl of the Limberlost (1934)
 Go West (1940) 
 Go West Young Dog (1977)
 The Great Bank Robbery (1969)
 The Great Man's Whiskers (1969)
 The Great Meadow (1931)
 The Great Northfield Minnesota Raid (1972)
 The Great Race (1965) 
 Gold Rush (2006)
 Great Missouri Raid (1951)
 Guest of Cindy Sherman (2008) 
 Gunsmoke (1971) TV Series
 The Half-Breed (1916)
 The Hazards of Helen (1914)
 Hidalgo (2004)
 High Noon (1952)
 Highway to Heaven (1984) TV Series
 Hills of Home (1948)
 Honkytonk Man (1982)
 Hopalong Cassidy (television series, 1952)
 If You Believe It, It's So (1922)
 In Old Chicago (1937)
 Indiana Jones and the Last Crusade (1989)
 The Iron Horse (1966)
 The Inventing of America (1975)
 Ishi: The Last of His Tribe (1978)
 Jack Slade (1953)
 Joe Dancer: The Big Trade (1981)
 Joe Hill (1971)
 The Johnstown Flood (1926)
 Kansas Pacific (1952)
 Kate Bliss and the Ticker Tape Kid (1978)
 Kenny Rogers as The Gambler (1980)
 Kenny Rogers as The Gambler: The Adventure Continues (1983)
 Kidschool (2001)
 The Kissing Bandit (1948)
 Lacey and the Mississippi Queen (1978)
 Lasca of the Rio Grande (1931)
 Lassie (1961) TV Series
 Last of His Tribe (1992)
 The Last Ride of the Dalton Gang (1979) (TV)
 Legend of Jesse James (1965) TV Series
 Let Me Tell You A Song (1972)
 Libeled Lady (1936)
 Little House on the Prairie (1974) TV Series 
 Locked Doors (1925)
 Lone Cowboy (1933) 
 The Lone Ranger (1956) TV Series
 The Long Riders (1980)
 The Love Bug (1969)
 Mail Order Bride (1964)
 Man Called Gannon (1969)
 Man From Shiloh (1970) TV Series
 The Man from U.N.C.L.E. (1967) TV Series
 Man of Conquest (1939)
 Man of the West (1958)
 Man Power (1927) 
 The Man Who Won (1923)
 Maxie (1984)
 Money! Money! Money! (1923)
 The Moonlighter (1953)
 Mountain Justice (1937)
 My Little Chickadee (1940)
 Nichols (1971) TV Series
 Nickelodeon (1976)
 The Night Rider (1979)
 No One's Watching: An Alien Abductee's Story (2006)
 No Place to Run (1972)
 North of 36 (1924)
 North of the Rio Grande (1937)
 Not a Drum Was Heard (1924)
 Oklahoma Crude (1973)
 The Omaha Trail (1942)
 The Outrage (1964)
 Over the Hill (1931)
 Overland Trails (1948)
 Overland Trail (1960) TV Series
 Ox Train (1952)
 The Painted Hills (1951)
 Pale Rider (1984)
 Paradise (1988) TV Series
 Passion (1954)
 The Perils of Pauline (1967)
 Petticoat Junction (1963)
 Pierre of the Plains (1942)
 The Prisoner of Zenda (1937)
 Promises (1998)
 Radio Flyer (1992)
 Rage at Dawn (1955)
 The Raiders (1932)
 The Rare Breed (1966)
 Rawhide (1960) TV Series
 The Red Glove (1919) 
 The Red House (1947) 
 The Red Pony (1973) (TV)
 Redemption of the Ghost (2002)
 The Return of Frank James (1940)
 Riders of the Cactus (1931)
 The Right of Way (1931)
 The Robin Hood of El Dorado (1936)
 Rose Marie (1936)
 The Romance of Rosy Ridge (1947)
 Roseanna McCoy (1949)
 Rustlers' Valley (1937)
 The Sacketts (1979) (TV) 
 San Antone (1953)
 Santa Fe Trail (1940)
 Sawyer and Finn (1983)
 Scalplock (1965)
 Scarlet Days (1919)
 Scars of Jealousy (1923)
 Scouts to the Rescue (1939)
 Scudda Hoo! Scudda Hay! (1948)
 Seven Brides for Seven Brothers (1982) TV Series
 Seven Wonders of The Industrial World: The Line (2003)
 The Shadow Riders (1982) (TV) 
 Shaughnessy (1996) (TV)
 Sierra Passage (1951)
 The Silent Call (1921)
 Silver City (1951) 
 Silver Whip (1953) 
 Singer Jim McKee (1924)
 Slither (1973)
 Something for a Lonely Man (1968) 
 Somewhere in Sonora (1933)
 Son of Slade (1955)
 The Song of the Lark (2001)
 Songs and Saddles (1938) 
 Stampede (1949)
 Tales of Wells Fargo (1957) TV Series
 The Terror (1920)
 Terror in a Texas Town (1958)
 Tess of the Storm Country (1960)
 The Texan (1930)
 Texas Lady (1955)
 Texas Rangers (1951)
 Three Bad Men (2005)
 Three Wishes (2005) TV Series 
 Timber Stampede (1939)
 Timber Wolf (1925)
 Toast of New York (1937)
 The Toll Gate (1920)
 Trail Dust (1936)
 The Trail Rider (1925)
 Traveling Salesman (1921)
 True Tales (1991) TV Series
 Two Alone (1934)
 Unforgiven (1992)
 Union Pacific (1939)
 The Virginian (1929)
 Wagon Wheels (1934)
 The West of the Imagination (1986)
 Wells Fargo (1937)
 When the Daltons Rode (1940)
 Where the Wind Dies (1954)
 Whispering Smith (1948)
 White-Collar Crime (1996) 
 Wichita (1955)
 The Wild Wild West (1964) TV Series
 Without Compromise (1922)
 World's Greatest Lover (1977)
 Wyoming (1940)
 Wyoming Mail (1950)
 The Young Riders (1969) TV Series
 Young Tom Edison (1940)
The Other Kids (2016)

See also

References

Sonora, California
Films shot in Sonora
Sonora
History of Tuolumne County, California
Sonora